Sukhdev Singh Dhillon (1952 – 12 July 1988), best known as Labh Singh and also known as Sukha Sipahi and General Labh Singh, was a former Punjab police officer turned militant who took command of the Khalistan Commando Force after its first leader, Manbir Singh Chaheru, was arrested in 1986.

He was an associate of Jarnail Singh Bhindranwale and fought against the Indian Army during Operation Blue Star.
He was involved in the attack on the Director-General of the Punjab Police, Julio Francis Ribeiro.
He allegedly masterminded what was then India's largest bank robbery, taking almost Rs. 60 million ($4.5 million) from the Punjab National Bank, Miller Gunj branch, Ludhiana. which enabled the Khalistan Commando Force to buy weapons.

Early life

Labh Singh's original name was Sukhdev Singh Dhillon
He was also known as Sukha Sipahi.
He lived in the village of Panjwar, in Tehsil (sub-district) Patti in district Amritsar and owned  of land.
He married Davinder Kaur.

Punjab Police service

After finishing his education at Baba Buddha Sahib College, Labh Singh joined the Punjab Police force in 1971 and served the force until he left his job in 1983.

Association with Jarnail Singh Bhindranwale

Influenced by Jarnail Singh Bhindranwale, Labh Singh left the Punjab police in 1983, and joined the Sikh freedom movement.

In May 1984, Labh Singh, Gursewak Singh Babla, Gurinder Singh and Swaranjit Singh were accused of killing Hind Samachar newspaper group editor Ramesh Chander,
who was an outspoken critic of Jarnail Singh Bhindranwale
and had written that Punjab had "become a slaughterhouse."
In a call to an Amritsar news agency, responsibility for the attack in Jullundur by four armed men was claimed by Sikh militant group Deshmesh Regiment.

During Operation Blue Star, he fought against the Indian Army with other Sikh militants.
He was arrested by the army after the operation.

Association with Khalistan Commando Force

Jailbreak
6 people were killed, and more injured, in a violent attack on the District court in Jalandhar, Punjab, India. Accounts of the attack, reported on 6 April 1986 in the US, differed. According to an unidentified source in Mahmood's "Fighting for Faith and Nation: Dialogues with Sikh Militants", the attack was made by Sikh militant leader Manbir Singh Chaheru and his associates.

"The Courier" of Arizona, US, carried a story attributed to UPI stating that 3 "Sikh terrorists" killed 3 police officers who were taking 3 prisoners to a bathroom, while "16 armed court guards cowered in fear".  The report stated that 2 police holding a 4th prisoner were also gunned down, and that "Three other officers, a lawyer, and a bystander were wounded as the Sikhs sprayed the area for 15 minutes." Police said that the guards were too frightened to return fire.  This fourth suspect remained in custody.  Finally, the Courier article reported that the Sikhs looted "three rifles and a submachine gun" from the dead bodies, and that a 6th officer later succumbed to wounds from the attack.

The "Wilmington Morning Star" carried an AP story, and related that 3 "Sikh extremists" killed 4 police officers inside the District Court complex, killed two officers who "were shot at the courtyard gate as the attackers fled", and wounded 4 other individuals, including a lawyer.  The Star identified the freed suspects as Labh Singh, Gurinder Singh, and Swaranjit Singh, who were to appear in court on charges of slaying Ramesh Chander, a Hindu newspaper editor.  The Star reported that District Magistrate S.C. Aggarwal said 4 attackers fired over a compound wall from a lane.  It further reported that others witnessed the attackers open fire from close range as police led the prisoners to the toilet.  The report concluded with District Police Chief Baljit Singh Sandhu's statement that the attackers hard "fired at least 50 rounds" in the attack.

The "Eugene Register-Guardian" reported that District Magistrate S.C. Aggarwal said in a telephone interview that 3 or more attackers opened fire as 4 defendants accused of the May 1984 slaying of Ramesh Chander, were being led into the compound, and that the attackers took 3 rifles from the slain police.

This single incident became a basis of Roberio's "Bullet for bullet" policy.

KCF leadership
After KCF's first leader, Manbir Singh Chaheru was arrested and disappeared or died, Labh Singh took over the leadership of Khalistan Commando Force.

One unnamed author speculated in "Genesis of terrorism: an analytical study of Punjab terrorists" that Labh Singh "perhaps" maintained his links with Babbar Khalsa International.

Attack on Director General of Punjab Police
Although account details differ, on 3 October 1986, men identified in the press as Sikh militants in police uniforms attacked Director-General Punjab Police Julio Francis Ribeiro inside his headquarters in the city of Jalandhar, Punjab, India, with automatic weapons. One guard was killed, and Ribeiro, his wife, and four other officers were injured. Ribeiro's wound was minor, but his wife was hospitalized. Khalistan Commando Force later claimed responsibility for this attack. KCF leader Labh Singh allegedly led the attack.

Bank robbery
Labh Singh allegedly masterminded what was at that time the largest bank robbery in Indian history, netting almost 60 million (58 million rupees-US$4.5 million) from the Millar Ganj branch of the Punjab National Bank, Ludhiana; a part of this stolen money belonged to the Reserve Bank of India, India's central bank. It was documented as the "Biggest Bank Robbery" under "Curiosities and wonders" in the Limca Book of Records. The loot enabled the Khalistan Commando Force to buy sophisticated weapons and AK-47 rifles. Sikh militants often used bank robberies to finance their campaign against the Indian government.

The Chicago Sun-Times reported that "12 to 15 Sikhs dressed as policemen and armed with submachine guns and rifles escaped with nearly $4.5 million in the biggest bank robbery in Indian history." "No one was injured." A Police spokesman described it as "a neat and clean operation".

Khalistan Commando Force members who allegedly participated in the robbery included Harjinder Singh Jinda, Mathra Singh, Paramjit Singh Panjwar, Satnam Singh Bawa, Gurnam Singh Bundala, Sukhdev Singh Sukha, Daljit Singh Bittu, Gursharan Singh Gamma and Pritpal Singh.

Death
In June 1988, the Panthic committee appointed Labh Singh a high priest, but on 12 July 1988 he was killed in an encounter with police near Tanda, Hoshiarpur, Punjab, India.

At that time, he was wanted in relation to the murder of a dozen policemen, newspaper editor Ramesh Chander, and an attempt on the former Punjab Police Chief Julio Francis Ribeiro.
Amritsar Police Superintendent Suresh Arora said "We have broken the back of the KCF. Sukhdev Singh was the most dreaded of the terrorists."

The Tribune of India carried a report of a neighbor's statement that, after his death, many of his family emigrated to Canada, though his father-in-law stayed on in Labh Singh's house. The neighbor further stated that the father-in-law committed suicide after police beat him "mercilessly", and that the house then remained deserted for several years, but that finally it has been taken over by his relatives.

Kanwaljit Singh Sultanwind succeeded Labh Singh as leader of the KCF.

The Tribune India reported in July 2006 that a Bhog (Sikh religious ceremony) for Labh Singh was held "in the past few months".

See also 
Khalistan Movement

Footnotes

References

External links 

Indian Sikhs
Sikh martyrs
Khalistan movement people
Indian police officers
1952 births
1988 deaths
Punjabi people
Sikh terrorism
People shot dead by law enforcement officers in India
Bank robbers
Sikh warriors